Bokusha is a rural locality (a village) in Lavrovskoye Rural Settlement, Sudogodsky District, Vladimir Oblast, Russia. The population was 22 as of 2010.

Geography 
Bokusha is located 14 km north of Sudogda (the district's administrative centre) by road. Popelyonki is the nearest rural locality.

References 

Rural localities in Sudogodsky District